Shaky Ground is an American sitcom, created by Bob Keyes, Chip Keyes, and Doug Keyes, which starred Matt Frewer as Bob Moody, a hapless but supportive and caring father. Robin Riker played his wife and Matthew Brooks, Jennifer Love Hewitt, and Bradley Pierce played their children. The show aired on Fox from December 27, 1992 to May 23, 1993.

Theme
Bob Moody was mid-life, mid-career, middle-management and middle-class. He worked as a quality-control inspector for United General Technologies. He loved his family and worked hard to support them, but in ways was struggling with adulthood as well.  Episodes often focused on Bob's thwarted ambitions at work, or the fact that he was not a traditional husband and father at home. Bob managed to get by as a result of finding the confidence to accept himself. Some episodes were surrealistic in nature, such as Bob trying an experimental hair-restoration product that slowly turned him into a werewolf.  In another episode he takes up  "Dance Fu", a combination of the martial arts and jazz dancing, to protect his family's right to go to a restaurant after a bully from work threatens him. Other episodes were more down to earth.  In one Bob stages a sit-in in his younger son's treehouse in order to protest oppressive zoning laws which demand the treehouse be demolished. In another episode his daughter asks him to stay in the kitchen and not embarrass her at her first party, but when it flops, he livens it up with disco music and a game of Twister to everyone's delight and helps his daughter approach a boy she likes. However outlandish the situations became, the series was always grounded in family life.

The series finale had Bob circulating a petition to save the local school music program, ultimately Bob is tackled by Secret Service agents when he tries to get newly-elected President Bill Clinton to sign the petition - in a men's room.

Scheduled alongside primetime broadcasts of Batman: The Animated Series, against powerhouse 60 Minutes, Shaky Ground struggled in its time slot, while retaining a small but devoted cult following.  Howard Rosenberg of the Los Angeles Times described the show as "sneaky-funny" in his 1992 review.

Cast
Matt Frewer as Bob Moody
Robin Riker as Helen Moody
Matthew Brooks as Carter Moody
Jennifer Love Hewitt as Bernadette Moody
Harold Sylvester as Russell 
Bradley Pierce as Dylan Moody

Episode list

External links
 

1990s American sitcoms
Fox Broadcasting Company original programming
1992 American television series debuts
1993 American television series endings
Television series by Warner Bros. Television Studios
English-language television shows
Television shows set in Los Angeles